Cole McLagan (born August 11, 1996) is an American soccer player.

Career

Youth
Raised in Lee's Summit, Missouri, McLagan played prep soccer at Rockhurst High School, where he was an all-state and all-region selection while serving as team captain, as well as being named All-Western Offensive Player of the Year. He also played club soccer with Sporting Blue Valley, helping the team to a state championship and Surf Cup title.

College
In 2017, McLagan attended Furman University to play college soccer. In four seasons, after redshirting in 2016 as well as having a truncated 2020 season due to the COVID-19 pandemic, McLagan went on to make 67 appearances for the Paladins, scoring 19 goals and tallying 9 assists. He earned second team All-Southern Conference and SoCon All-Freshman honors in 2017, and claimed First team All-Southern Conference honors in 2019 and 2020.

Whilst at college, McLagan also appeared in the USL League Two with Kaw Valley in 2018, and Tri-Cities Otters in 2019.

Professional
On May 12, 2021, McLagan signed with Greenville Triumph of USL League One. He made his professional debut on June 13, 2021, appearing as a 75th-minute substitute during a 3–0 loss to North Texas SC.

On February 28, 2022, McLagan signed with MLS Next Pro side Sporting Kansas City II.

References

External links 
 

1996 births
American soccer players
Association football defenders
Furman Paladins men's soccer players
Greenville Triumph SC players
Living people
MLS Next Pro players
People from Lee's Summit, Missouri
Soccer players from Missouri
Sporting Kansas City II players
USL League One players
USL League Two players